4897 Tomhamilton, provisional designation , is a stony asteroid from the outer region of the asteroid belt, approximately 14 kilometers in diameter. It was discovered on 22 August 1987, by American astronomer Eleanor Helin at Palomar Observatory, California. It was later named after American writer Thomas Hamilton, author of astronomy books and participant in the Apollo program.

Classification and orbit 

Tomhamilton orbits the Sun in the outer main-belt at a distance of 2.7–3.4 AU once every 5 years and 4 months (1,953 days). Its orbit has an eccentricity of 0.12 and an inclination of 11° with respect to the ecliptic.

In August 1950, a first precovery was taken at Palomar, extending the asteroid's observation arc by 37 years prior to its official discovery observation.

On 11 January 2011, it was at opposition (coinciding with Hamilton's 72nd birthday) at a distance of 2.476 AU. Given the moderately elliptical orbit, this asteroid can on rare occasions reach an apparent magnitude from Earth of about 10.9.

Naming 

This minor planet was named after Thomas William Hamilton, an American (born San Francisco, 1939) who was a child actor (he played "Barnaby" in Barnaby and Mr. O'Malley and was on the early television show Mr. I-Magination). As an adult he abandoned acting to return to his primary interest as an astronomer.  As such he worked on the Apollo program, determining fuel requirements and radar accuracy requirements for lunar orbit rendezvous. He later worked as an astronomy educator and planetarium director, and is the author of time travel and science fiction novels, and also wrote six books on astronomical topics. Hamilton and Helin were acquainted, as he had interviewed her at an astronomical conference for a cable television show he was producing at the time. The official  was published by the Minor Planet Center on 4 October 2009.

Physical characteristics

Diameter and albedo 

According to the survey carried out by NASA's Wide-field Infrared Survey Explorer with its subsequent NEOWISE mission, Tomhamilton measures 13.7 kilometers in diameter and its surface has an albedo of 0.215, which indicates that it of a stony rather than of a carbonaceous composition.

Lightcurve 

As of 2017, no rotational lightcurve of Tomhamilton has been obtained from photometric observations. It rotation period, poles and shape remain unknown.

Books by Hamilton 
 Books on astronomical topics:
 Useful Star Names 
 Our Neighbor Stars 
 Moons of the Solar System 
 Dwarf Planets and Asteroids 
 Impact Craters of Earth 
 Astronomical Numbers 
 Other books:
 Time for Patriots, a time travel adventure novel 
 The Mountain of Long Eyes, an anthology of 27 stories of fantasy, science fiction, and satire. 
 Weird Thoughts, a mixed anthology of 17 stories of science fiction, fantasy, and satire; plus seven essays on topics related to astronomy, including one describing the author's experience working on the Apollo Project.  
 Scam Artists of the Galaxy, 19 stories of a pair of cousins cheating their way across planets. 
 Election Matters:  Life on Universityworld, novel dealing with three intertwined plot lines.  
Hamilton has also had many astronomical articles in The Constellation, and science fiction in Aphelion, Bewildering Stories (Oct. 30, 2017, "An Arkham Halloween"), and Changingthetimes.com (Nov. 23, 2020, "Moctezuma Succeeds").

Scholarship 
In 2011, using funds that had come down from his great great grandfather Thomas Oliver Larkin, Hamilton created the Hamilton Planetarium Scholarship Fund to encourage and train students to enter the planetarium field as a career.

References

External links 
 Asteroid Lightcurve Database (LCDB), query form (info )
 Dictionary of Minor Planet Names, Google books
 Asteroids and comets rotation curves, CdR – Observatoire de Genève, Raoul Behrend
 Discovery Circumstances: Numbered Minor Planets (1)-(5000) – Minor Planet Center
 
 
 Planetarian (Journal of the International Planetarium Society), March 2011, Vol. 40, No. 1, page 26

004897
Discoveries by Eleanor F. Helin
Named minor planets
19870822